The Long Now may refer to:
 Long Now Foundation, a society founded by Stewart Brand and Brian Eno for the promotion of long-term thinking
 Clock of the Long Now, a proposed clock designed to keep time for 10,000 years, being designed as a project of the Long Now Foundation
 The Long Now (album), a 2008 album by the Australian indie rock band Children Collide
 January 07003: Bell Studies for the Clock of the Long Now, a 2003 album by Brian Eno
 "Long Now", a 2013 single by Owen Tromans inspired by the Long Now Foundation